The Hon. George Edward Adeane  (4 October 1939 – 20 May 2015) was an English barrister and royal advisor who served as Private Secretary to the Prince of Wales from 1979 to 1985.

Early years and education 
Adeane was born in 1939, the son of Michael Adeane (created a life peer as Baron Adeane in 1972) and Helen Chetwynd-Stapylton, the daughter of Richard Chetwynd-Stapylton. The family had a long history of service to the royal family. His maternal great-grandfather was Arthur Bigge, later Lord Stamfordham, private secretary to Queen Victoria and King George V. His paternal great-grandfather was Admiral Edward Stanley Adeane. Adeane's father was Private Secretary to the Queen for 19 years, between 1953 and 1972.

He was educated at Eton College and Magdalene College, Cambridge, where he graduated with an MA. He was a Page of Honour to The Queen from 1954 to 1956.

Career 
In 1960 and 1961 he was a Plebiscite Supervisor in the Southern Cameroon. He was called to the Bar at the Middle Temple in July 1962, and specialised in libel until 1979. As a barrister, he defended Time Out magazine, owned by Playboy Publications, Inc., in 1973, when they had accused Fiona Lewis, an actress, of being involved with South American revolutionaries. She was awarded damages.

The following year, he represented The Spectator magazine who had libelled publishers Jonathan Cape, suggesting they were in financial difficulties, and won a similar outcome in that case. In 1975 he was more successful in representing Marcia, Lady Falkender, who was falsely accused of forging the signature of her boss, former Prime Minister Harold Wilson. She was paid damages and costs. In 1977, Adeane represented Marlene Dietrich in a libel case brought by producer Alexander Cohen for breach of contract, as a disreputable performer.

Adeane was appointed Private Secretary and Treasurer to the Prince of Wales in May 1979 to succeed David Checketts. Prince Charles and Edward Adeane shared a passion in angling on the River Test near Stockbridge, Hampshire. Adeane was a member of the Houghton Fishing Club, where he continued to fish right up until his last days. On the engagement of Lady Diana Spencer and the Prince, she was due to arrive at The Albany, where Adeane had a set of rooms (that is, an apartment). The staff expected octogenarian Lady Diana Cooper, but were bemused to find a much younger lady arrive in her Mini Metro and park perfectly. Princess Diana had a nervous start in a royal household, where she dismissed almost all of the staff. Adeane was made the Princess's Treasurer in 1981 on their marriage. Adeane was granted the additional appointment as private secretary to the Princess in 1984, following Oliver Everett's resignation. The alleged trouble started during the 1983 royal tour of Australia and New Zealand, when the Princess first expressed concern at leaving her children behind in London. The Daily Mirror reported her calling Adeane a "fuddy-duddy".

When Adeane tried to plan a tour of Australia in 1984, he was accused of trying to manipulate State elections in Victoria for political purposes. In attempting to distance the Premier, Adeane was quoted in the Daily Mirror and other newspapers.

Adeane resigned after disagreements and accusations that he was taking decisions without consulting the prince, and having too much of the 'old school tie' about him. However Adeane found that the prince invariably did the opposite of what he was advised. An almost unprecedented state of affairs materialised on 19 March 1985, when the press were invited into Buckingham Palace to discuss relations. Evidently the last straw for Adeane he resigned on 31 March 1985. He was appointed Extra Equerry to the Prince of Wales from 1985, and appointed Commander of the Royal Victorian Order. He represented the Prince at Royal Household memorial services – and returned to practice at the Bar. His departure commenced a period of instability in royal sinecures, including the Queen's annus horribilis, with several private secretaries coming and going in short order. He was replaced by Sir John Riddell.

In popular culture 
Adeane is portrayed on-screen in the Netflix original series The Crown by actor Richard Goulding.

References

Offices held

1939 births
2015 deaths
Commanders of the Royal Victorian Order
Pages of Honour
Alumni of Magdalene College, Cambridge
People educated at Eton College
Members of the Middle Temple
Members of the Household of the Prince of Wales
English LGBT people
Edward
Sons of life peers
English barristers